The Asia/Oceania Zone was one of three zones of regional competition in the 2016 Fed Cup.

Group I 
 Venue: Hua Hin Centennial Sports Club, Hua Hin, Thailand (outdoor hard).
 Date: 3–6 February.

The eight teams were divided into two pools of four teams. The two pool winners took part in a play-off to determine the nation advancing to the World Group II play-offs. The nations finishing last in their pools took part in relegation play-offs, with the losing nation was relegated to Group II for 2017.

Pools

Play-offs

Final placements 

 was promoted to the 2016 Fed Cup World Group II play-offs.
 was relegated to Asia/Oceania Zone Group II in 2017.

Group II 
 Venue: Centennial Sports Club, Hua Hin, Thailand (outdoor hard)
 Dates: 11–16 April
The eleven teams were divided into two pools, one of five teams and one of six teams. The two nations placing first in their pools took part in play-offs to determine the nation promoted to Group I in 2017.

Pools

Play-offs

Final placements 

  were promoted to Asia/Oceania Group I in 2017.

References 

 Fed Cup Result, 2016 Asia/Oceania Group I
 Fed Cup Result, 2016 Asia/Oceania Group II

External links 
 Fed Cup website

 
Asia